The Big Adventure is a 1921 American silent adventure film directed by B. Reeves Eason and starring B. Reeves Eason Jr., Lee Shumway and Gertrude Olmstead.

Cast
 B. Reeves Eason Jr. as Patches 
 Fred Herzog as Old Whiskers
 Lee Shumway as John Wellborn
 Molly Shafer as 	Mrs. Lane
 Gertrude Olmstead as Sally

References

Bibliography
 Connelly, Robert B. The Silents: Silent Feature Films, 1910-36, Volume 40, Issue 2. December Press, 1998.
 Munden, Kenneth White. The American Film Institute Catalog of Motion Pictures Produced in the United States, Part 1. University of California Press, 1997.

External links
 

1921 films
1921 adventure films
American silent feature films
American adventure films
Films directed by B. Reeves Eason
American black-and-white films
Universal Pictures films
1920s English-language films
1920s American films
Silent adventure films